Vivek Ramaswamy is campaigning for the 2024 United States presidential election. He filed for his presidential campaign on February 21, 2023.

Background 
Ramaswamy had previously considered a candidacy in the 2022 United States Senate election in Ohio, but ultimately decided not to run. Since the outcome of the 2022 midterm elections, he had been named as a potential presidential candidate. By early February, it was reported that Ramaswamy had begun assembling a presidential campaign team. If elected, he would become the first Asian American president and the first Indian American president.

Political positions 
According to Ramaswamy, "The most fundamental divide of our time is not black vs white, gay vs straight, or even Democrat vs Republican. It is the Great Reset vs the Great Uprising. Aristocracy vs sovereignty. Self-governance vs monarchy. This is a transpartisan & transnational struggle." In his campaign announcement, Ramaswamy stated "I'm all for putting  America First, but in order to put America first, we have to first rediscover what America is. And to me, those are these basic rules of the road that set this nation into motion from meritocracy to free speech, to self-governance over aristocracy.

A profile in The New York Times described Ramaswamy as an anti-woke candidate whereas The Hill characterizes him as a conservative. His campaign has also been compared to Andrew Yang's 2020 presidential campaign by media outlets such as Fox News. According to a profile in Politico, Ramaswamy was inspired by Donald Trump's victory in the 2016 presidential election, and wants to run "with an entrepreneurial spirit, unorthodox ideas, and few expectations" in the hopes of building "a major following that will carry him to the presidency.

In his campaign announcement, Ramaswamy pitched himself as a conservative and argued "what the conservative movement needs to do is more than just criticize the poison that fills the void but fill the vacuum with a vision of American national identity that runs so deep that it dilutes these other religions, from wokism to Islamism."

Foreign policy

China
During his campaign announcement, Ramaswamy stated that America needed a “total decoupling” from China. He has described the Chinese government as a "great existential threat" and argues China now represents a more significant threat to the sovereignty of United States than the Soviet Union had during the Cold War as America has found itself in an "economic codependent relationship" with a hostile government. Ramaswamy also argued that America has become too economically reliant on China through being "addicted" to cheap goods and that economic separation from China would not be easy, but “some sacrifice of short-term conveniences” would be necessary for the long-term goal of reducing economic dependence on China.

Military intervention
Ramaswamy argues that "foreign policy is all about prioritization" and that good use of the US military is "protecting American soil and American interests, not a pointless war somewhere else."

Ramaswamy argues that the United States should use the military to directly take on Mexican drug cartels and “end the fentanyl epidemic in this country." He has furthermore stated "We can do it to Bin Laden, we can do it to Soleimani, we can do it to the Mexican drug cartels south of the border."

Social policy

Affirmative action
Ramaswamy has expressed opposition to affirmative action and has proposed rescinding Lyndon B. Johnson’s Executive Order 11246.

Federal government
Ramaswamy argues for eight-year limits for all unelected federal bureaucrats, similar to term limits imposed on US presidents. He has also identified ten federal agencies that he would abolish, including the US Department of Education.

Freedom of speech
Ramaswamy has stated that if elected president he would fight government pressures on technology companies to censor disfavored political speech. He said “As Elon Musk did at Twitter, I will release the ‘state action files’ from the federal government—publicly exposing every known instance in which bureaucrats have wrongfully pressured companies to take constitutionally prohibited actions.” He also wrote "If you can’t fire someone for being black, gay or Muslim, you shouldn’t be able to fire someone for his political speech.”

Immigration
Ramaswamy calls for a merit-based system of immigration and supports scrapping lottery-based immigration such as the Diversity Immigrant Visa. He also states America must "unapologetically" secure the southern border against illegal immigration.

References

External links
Official site
Declaration of Candidacy (Form 2) at FEC.gov

Ramaswamy, Vivek
Asian conservatism in the United States